The La Plata or Chusma Fault is a dextral oblique thrust fault in the department of Huila in southwestern Colombia.

Etymology 
The fault is named after La Plata, Huila.

Description 
The La Plata or Chusma Fault extends across the eastern slope of the Central Ranges of the Colombian Andes, southeast of the city of Neiva in southwestern Colombia. The fault displaces Triassic, Jurassic and Cretaceous sedimentary rocks, as well as Tertiary volcanic rocks. Coalescent Quaternary alluvial fan deposits are offset by the La Plata Fault. The trace is characterised by old retreated and declined scarps, en-echelon semiparallel associated faults that cut alluvial deposits of the Páez River and local lahar deposits, a well developed topographic fault-line expression, and a probable pull-apart basin filled with Quaternary alluvial fans and alluvium near the town of La Plata. Activity of the fault in 1967 and 1996 has been registered.

See also 

 List of earthquakes in Colombia
 Eastern Frontal Fault System
 Irlanda Fault
 La Dina Fault
 Romeral Fault System

References

Bibliography

Maps 
 

Seismic faults of Colombia
Thrust faults
Strike-slip faults
Active faults
Faults
Earthquakes in Colombia